Love's Carnival is a 1955 West German historical drama film directed by Willy Birgel and starring Ruth Niehaus, Dietmar Schönherr and Elma Karlowa. It was shot at the Wiesbaden Studios and on location in Baden-Baden and Rastatt. The film's sets were designed by the art directors Fritz Maurischat and Theo Zwierski.

Cast

See also
Rosenmontag (1924)
Love's Carnival (1930)

References

Bibliography 
 Knop, Matthias. Rote Rosen und weisser Flieder: die Blütezeit der Filmstadt Wiesbaden. Museum Wiesbaden, 1995.
 Parish, Robert. Film Actors Guide. Scarecrow Press, 1977.

External links 
 

1955 films
West German films
1950s German-language films
German historical drama films
1950s historical drama films
German films based on plays
Films set in the 1900s
Remakes of German films
Gloria Film films
1955 drama films
1950s German films